The eTwinning action is an initiative of the European Commission that aims to encourage European schools to collaborate using Information and Communication Technologies (ICT) by providing the necessary infrastructure (online tools, services, support). Therefore, teachers registered in the eTwinning action are enabled to form partnerships and develop collaborative, pedagogical school projects in any subject area with the sole requirements to employ ICT to develop their project and collaborate with teachers from other European countries.

Formation
The project was founded in 2005 under the European Union's e-Learning program and it has been integrated in the Lifelong Learning program since 2007. eTwinning is part of Erasmus+, the EU program for education, training, and youth.

History
The eTwinning action was launched in January 2005. Its main objectives complied with the decision by the Barcelona European Council in March 2002 to promote school twinning as an opportunity for all students to learn and practice ICT skills and to promote awareness of the multicultural European model of society. It is now a very successful component of the Erasmus+ program, the EU program for education, training, youth and sport. More than 13 000 schools were involved in eTwinning within its first year. In fall 2008, over 50 000 teachers and 4 000 projects have been registered, while a new eTwinning platform was launched. As of January 2018, over 70 000 projects are running in classrooms across Europe. In early 2009, the eTwinning motto has changed from "School partnerships in Europe" to "The community for schools in Europe".

Operation
The main concept behind eTwinning is that schools are paired with another school elsewhere in Europe and they collaboratively develop a project, also known as eTwinning project. The two schools then communicate using the Internet (for example, by e-mail or video conferencing) to collaborate, share and learn from each other. eTwinning encourages and develops ICT skills as the main activities inherently use information technology. Being 'twinned' with a foreign school also encourages cross-cultural exchanges of knowledge, fosters students' intercultural awareness, and improves their communication skills.

eTwinning projects last for any length of time ranging from only a week, to months, up to creating permanent relationships between schools. Schools (both primary and secondary) within the European Union member states can participate in the eTwinning project, in addition to schools from Turkey, Norway and Iceland.

In contrast with other European programs, such as the Comenius program, all communication is held via the internet and therefore there is no need for grants. Along the same lines, face-to-face meetings between partners schools are not required, though they are not prohibited and some schools organise face-to-face meetings.

European schoolnet has been granted the role of Central Support Service (CSS) at European level. eTwinning is also supported by a network of National Support Services

Participating countries
Member States of the European Union are part of eTwinning: Austria, Belgium, Bulgaria, Croatia, Cyprus, Czech Republic, Denmark, Estonia, Finland, France, Germany, Greece, Hungary, Ireland, Italy, Latvia, Lithuania, Luxembourg, Malta, Poland, Portugal, Romania, Slovakia, Slovenia, Spain, Sweden and The Netherlands. Overseas territories and countries are also eligible. In addition, Albania, Bosnia and Herzegovina, North Macedonia, Iceland, Liechtenstein, Norway, Serbia and Turkey can also take part.

Seven countries from the European neighbourhood – Armenia, Azerbaijan, Georgia, Moldova and Ukraine, which are part of the Eastern Partnership and Tunisia and Jordan which are part of the Euro-Mediterranean Partnership (EUROMED) are also part of eTwinning via the eTwinning Plus scheme (https://plus.etwinning.net).

References

 Gilleran, A. (2007) eTwinning – A New Path for European Schools, eLearning Papers
 European Schoolnet (2007) Learning with eTwinning: A Handbook for Teachers 2007
 European Schoolnet (2006) Learning with eTwinning
 European Schoolnet (2008) eTwinning: Adventures in language and culture
 Konstantinidis, A. (2012). Implementing Learning-Oriented Assessment in an eTwinning Online Course for Greek Teachers. MERLOT Journal of Online Learning and Teaching, 8(1), 45–62

External links
 The official portal for eTwinning (available in 28 languages)
 European Schoolnet
 German eTwinning website
 British Council eTwinning
 Greek eTwinning website
 eTwinning – Italy
 Spanish eTwinning website
 French eTwinning website
 Press Release for 2008 etwinning prizes

Video clips
 eTwinning YouTube channel

Education in the European Union
Educational organizations based in Europe
Educational projects
Educational technology non-profits
Information technology organizations based in Europe
Information technology projects